Donald Burgy (born 1937) is an American conceptual artist, author, and teacher. He is Professor Emeritus in the Studio for Interrelated Media at Massachusetts College of Art and Design in Boston.  He earned a Bachelor of Fine Arts from the Massachusetts College of Art and Design (at that time known as the Massachusetts College of Art) in Boston in 1959 and a Master of Fine Arts from Rutgers University in 1963. Burgy began his teaching career in 1960 teaching art in public schools in Quincy and Chicopee in MA, and in Brentwood, NY. From 1966 - 1973, Burgy taught Art History and Art Studio at the Bradford Junior College in Bradford, MA. He was the chair of the Art Department at Milton Academy in Milton, MA from 1973 - 1975. Burgy taught Studio Art at Harvard University before his tenure at the Massachusetts College of Art and Design  (at that time known as the Massachusetts College of Art) in the Studio for Interrelated Media in Boston from 1971 until 2001. Donald Burgy has studied neurology, cosmology, and Paleolithic art as the basis for his conceptual artwork since 1969.

Background

Donald Burgy has received grants from the Ford Foundation, Rockefeller National Endowment, National Endowment for the Arts, and Massachusetts Council on the Arts. His work has been exhibited in the Museum of Modern Art, New York, at the Stadtiches Museum, Leverkusen, Germany, the Third Conference on Planetology and Space Mission Planning, New York Academy of Sciences, New York. His work includes a book entitled, Art Ideas for the Year 4000, published by the Addison Gallery of American Art, Andover, MA. Donald Burgy is one of the founders of the Conceptual Art Movement.

Collections

 Museum of Modern Art, New York, NY
 Addison Gallery of American Art, Andover, MA
 Mount Holyoke College Art Museum, South Hadley, MA 
 Boston Public Library Copley Square, Boston, MA
 Wellesley College Art Library, Wellesley, MA

References

 Horvitz, Robert Joseph. "Donald Burgy: Participating in the Universe." Artforum 13:1 (1974): p. 34-35.
 Structure Drawing, Mirrored Plexiglass. American Drawing 1968: catalog. Moore College of Art, Philadelphia. 1968.
 557,087. Curator: Lippard, L. Seattle. 1969.
 Burnham, J. Real Time Systems. Artforum. 1969.
 "Documentation of Selected Mental and Physical Characteristics of Donald Burgy.", "Douglas Huebler Lie Detector Examination.", "Documentation of the Pregnancy of Mrs. Geoffrey Moran.", & "Rock #5."  Konzeption-Conception: catalog. Städtischen Museum Leverkusen, Germany. 1969.
 "Check Up." Article in: Art in America: magazine. March–April, 1970.
 "Documentation of Selected Mental and Physical Characteristics of Donald Burgy From 1/20/69 to 1/30/69." 55708: catalog., Seattle Art Museum and Environs., Vancouver Art Gallery. 1970.
 "Documentation of Selected Mental and Physical Characteristics of Donald Burgy." 955,000: catalog. Vancouver Art Gallery. 1970.
 "Mind-Matter #1.", "Mind-Matter #2.", "Mind-Matter #3.", & "Mind Matter #4." Huebler, D. Duration Piece #8.New York: Castelli Gallery. 1970.
 "Order Idea 4.", "Time-Information Idea 2.", "Name Idea 1.", "Inside-Outside Exchange 3.", & "Space Completion Ideas." Art in the Mind: catalog. Allen Art Museum, Oberlin College. 1970.
 Statement and Exhibition Record in: Conceptual Art and Conceptual Aspect: catalog. New York Cultural Center, New York. 1970.
 "Time-Information Idea #5." Information: catalog. Museum of Modern Art, New York. 1970.
  "Art Ideas for the Year 4000 #1.", & "Context Completion Ideas." Arte Des Sistemas: catalog., Museo de Arte Moderno, Buenos Aires. 1971.
 Lippard, L. Changing: Essays in Art Criticism. New York: E.P. Dutton & Co. 1971.
 "Rock 2." Earth Air Fire Water: Elements of Art: catalog., Museum of Fine Arts, Boston. 1971.
 "Selected Mental and Physical Characteristics of Donals Burgy.", "Questions-Answers.", "Time-Information Idea #2.", & "Order Idea." Software, an Exhibition: catalog. Jewish Museum, New York. 1971.
 Sixth Seminar. Science, Art, Communication and Cosmology. The Total Environment and the Future of Civilization. Conference Artist and Art Director. S.S. Statendam: Cruise Liner. 1972.
 "Space Completion Ideas.", Name Idea #1.",  & "Art Idea for the Year 4000 #4." Meyer, U. A. Conceptual Art. New York: Dutton. 1972.
 "Art Idea for the Year 4000 #1." & "Art Idea for the Year 4000 #2." Kostelanetz, R. Breakthrough Fictioneers. Berlin: Something Else Press. 1973.
 Rocky #5." Six Years: The Dematerialization of the Art Object from 1966 to 1972. Praeger. New York.  1973.
  "This Page Exists..." Kostelanetz, R., Korn, H., & Metz, M. Fourth Assembling. 1973.
 Citation Page 69. Burnham, J. & Braziller, G. Great Western Salt Works. 1974
 "Evolution Completion Idea.", "Inside-Outside Exchange #3.", "Order Idea #1.", & " Time Exchange #2." Horvitz, J. Donald Burgy: Participating in the Universe. Artforum. September 1974.
  "April 21.", "Mind Evolves Matter As Matter Evolves Mind.", "Ends Means.", & "Boundaries."Video/Catalog. Le Center d’Art Et Communication. Buenos Aires. 1975.
 "Art Ideas for the Year 4000." Kostelanetz, R. Language & Structure in North America: catalog. Toronto: Kensington Art Association. 1975.
 "Ends-Means #1.", "Ends-Means #2.", "Ends-Means #3.", & "Ends-Means #4." Kostelanetz, R. Essaying Essays. New York: Out of London Press. 1975.
 "Evolution-Completion Idea." The Co-Evolution Quarterly. Summer 1976.
 "Documentation of Select Mental and Physical Characteristics of Donald Burgy." Elsen, A. E. Purposes of Art. New York: Holt, Rinehart, & Winston. 1977.
 Excerpt of Text from "April 21." in: For Twelve from Rutgers: catalog. The State University Art Gallery. 1977.
 "Notes for Things to do in the Future." CoEvolution Quarterly. Issue 15. Saulsalito, CA. Fall 1977.
 California Drought Catalog (A Dada Digest). Mutt, R. Northridge, CA. 1978.
 Signed and dedicated in: Assembling Assembling. Kostelanetz, R. Brooklyn. 1978.
 "To Be an Artist…" Skunk Piss Mag: statement. Vol. 2. Issue 1. Rockbury. Nov. 18-Dec. 2. 1978.
 "Optimizing." A Critical (Ninth) Assembling. Kostelanetz, R. 1979.
 "Order Idea #3.", "Art Idea for the Year 4000 #1." Kostelanetz, R. Scenarios: Scripts to Perform. Assembling Press. 1980.
 "Garden of Floral Evolution and Mass Accelertor." Kostelanetz, R., & Cole, D. Eleventh Assembling. 1981.
  "Context Completion Idea." SKY ART Conference ’81: catalog. MIT: Center for Advanced Visual Studies. 1981.
 "Context Completion Idea." SKY ART Conference ’83: catalog. MIT. 1983.
  Drawing for Book Jacket. Agosin, M. Brujas Y Also Mas. Pittsburgh: Latin America Literary Review Press. 1984.
  "Photographic Image of the Portland Vase’s Base." Doria, C., Middleman, R., & Schwendenwien, J. Assembling 12. 1986.
 Statement Composed of Proposals in: Imagining Antarctica: catalog. Stadt Museum, Linz. 1986
 "The Observer is Observed." Theatre of the Object: catalog. The Alternative Museum, New York. 1988.
  Askanas, M. Research Based Performance: Ballet Scientifique. P-Form. No. 37. Boston. Fall 1995.
 "This Page Exists…" Newman, M. & Bird, J. Rewriting Conceptual Art. London: Reaktion Books. 1999.
  Statement in: The Context of Art/ The Art of Context. Siegelaub, S., Fricke, M., & Fricke, R. Trieste: Navado Press. 2004.
 "Reading Europe’s Paleolithic Writing." Enzmann, R. D. & Burgy, D. R. Comparative Civilizations Review. No. 51. Fall 2005.
  "Reading Europe’s Paleolithic Writing." Burgy, D. T. Comparative Civilizations Review. No. 56. Spring 2007.
  "Rock #5." Geitner, A., & Bartholomew, S. On Location: Siting Robert Smithson and His Contemporaries. Black Dog Publishing. 2008.  
 "Time Exchange #1.", "Time Exchange #2.", "Time-Information Idea #1.", Time-Information Idea #2.", "Time-Information Idea #3.", "Time-Information Idea #4.", "Time-Information Idea #5.", "Name Idea #1.", "Name Idea #2.", "Inside-Outside Exchange #1.", "Inside-Outside Exchange #2.", "Inside-Outside Exchange #3.", "Inside-Outside Exchange #4.", "Order Idea #1.", "Order Idea #2.", & "Order Idea #3." Herrmann, G., Reymond, F., & Vallos, F. Art Conceptuel Une Entologie Editions Mix. 2008.
 Morgan, R. Conceptual Art. McFarland Publishers.

External links
 Rewriting Conceptual Art, editing by Michael Newman and Jon Bird, Reakton Books, 1999, pages 23, 25 
 2008 Video Interview with Donald Burgy by Joel Kurtz.
 Glimpse. READING EUROPE’S PALEOLITHIC WRITING: Gönnersdorf Platte 87, Issue 7. Winter 2011
    A production of The WGBH New Television Workshop © 1975 WGBH Educational Foundation and Donald Burgy.
  This project was made possible by grants from The National Endowment for the Arts and The Rockefeller Foundation.

Living people
1937 births
Massachusetts College of Art and Design faculty
Place of birth missing (living people)
Rutgers University alumni
Massachusetts College of Art and Design alumni